Carlo Ballesi (born 14 October 1949) is an Italian politician who served as a Senator (1992–1996) and Mayor of Macerata for two terms (1987–1990, 1990–1992).

He is the son of Elio Ballesi.

References

1949 births
Mayors of Macerata
Senators of Legislature XI of Italy
Senators of Legislature XII of Italy
Living people